The 2007 North Somerset Council election took place on 3 May 2007 to elect members of North Somerset Unitary Council in Somerset, England. The whole council was up for election and the Conservative Party gained overall control of the council from no overall control.

Background
Since the 2003 election the council was controlled by a coalition between the Liberal Democrat and Labour parties. Many of the swing wards on the council were in Weston-super-Mare, with a major issue in the town being the derelict Tropicana lido. The high number of pensioners in the town and lack of things for young people to do in the new estates were also factors in the area.

Election result
The results saw the Conservatives win a majority with 43 of the 61 seats contested. Both the Liberal Democrat and Labour parties suffered heavy losses, with the defeated councillors including Liberal Democrat Isabel Cummings in Yatton after 15 years on the council and the Labour couple Derek and Muriel Kraft.

The election in Weston-super-Mare North Worle ward was delayed after the death of the Liberal Democrat leader of the council Alan Hockridge, meaning it was not held at the same as the other seats. The postponed election in North Worle as held on 7 June and all 3 seats were won by the Conservatives taking the party to 46 seats.

Ward results

References

2007 English local elections
2007
2000s in Somerset